The Fort Apache Indian Reservation is an Indian reservation on the border of New Mexico and Arizona, United States, encompassing parts of Navajo, Gila, and Apache counties. It is home to the federally recognized White Mountain Apache Tribe of the Fort Apache Reservation (Western Apache language: Dził Łigai Si'án N'dee), a Western Apache tribe. It has a land area of 1.6 million acres and a population of 12,429 people as of the 2000 census. The largest community is in Whiteriver.

History 

Apache is a colonial classification term for the White Mountain Apache and all other Apache peoples. The White Mountain Apache consisted of three major groups that were made up of sub-groups called bands and clans, within which were families. There were clan rules controlling marriages between persons of families in different clans.

The largest of these three groups were collectively known as "On Top of Mountains People", the second major group was known as "Many Go to War People", and the last was known as "At the Base of the Mountains People". These names in indigenous White Mountain Apache dialect predate relations with the United States. Some contemporary White Mountain Apache have urged the adoption and use of these terms for the three major groups.

Fort Apache, originally called Camp Apache, was established by the United States Army in 1870 at the suggestion of White Mountain Apache leadership. They knew that the Navajo were resisting US supervision. After warfare, the US forced the Navajo and Mescalero Apache on the Long March to remove to Fort Sumner in New Mexico in 1863-1864, where they were held nearby at Bosque Redondo for years. They were finally allowed to return to their homeland in 1868. 

In 1871 General George Crook enrolled 50 White Mountain Apache men to serve as scouts for his army during the Apache Wars, which lasted intermittently for 15 years. These wars ended with the surrender of Chiricahua leader Geronimo in 1886. Because of the scouts' service to General Crook during the Apache Wars, he worked to enable the White Mountain Apache tribe to keep a large portion of their homeland as their reservation (named for them).

In 1922, the U.S. Army left Fort Apache, which was surrounded by the reservation. It was transferred to the Department of Interior's Bureau of Indian Affairs in 1923 for further use. The BIA established an Indian Boarding School here in order to use these facilities. It was named after President Theodore Roosevelt.

The school was designated as a National Historic Landmark in 2012, as a contributing part of Fort Apache Historic Park. The entire former military complex was recognized, as well as the role of the school in tribal assimilation.

The White Mountain Apache now operate the Roosevelt Indian School as a tribally controlled middle-school facility. They have a contractual arrangement with the Bureau of Indian Education, which funds the school.

Government
The White Mountain Apache created their own constitution under the Indian Reorganization Act of 1934. In 1936 they elected a tribal council that governs the tribe and reservation. It oversees all tribe-owned property, local businesses, and governance.

Geography
The Fort Apache Indian Reservation is covered mostly by pine forests and is habitat to a variety of forest wildlife. It is located directly south of the Mogollon Rim.

Economy

The tribe operates the Sunrise ski resort and the Hon-Dah Resort Casino and Conference Center. It has built the Apache Cultural Center & Museum, constructed in the traditional style of a gowa.

Other attractions within the reservation include the Fort Apache Historic Park, which has 27 buildings surviving of the historic fort and a  National Historic District; and other historic sites.

Kinishba Ruins, an ancient archeological site of the western Pueblo culture, is a National Historic Landmark. It is located on nearby associated tribal trust lands. Appointments may be made to visit the site.

Demographics
According to the US Census Bureau, the Fort Apache Indian Reservation, which is located in Navajo County, is developed with small communities. North Fork, Whiteriver, Fort Apache, East Fork, Rainbow City, Cibecue, Hon-Dah, McNary, Turkey Creek, and Seven Mile are the communities, comprising a total population of 22,036 in 2010 on the reservation.

Transportation
The White Mountain Apache Tribe operates the Fort Apache Connection Transit, which provides local bus service. The City of Show Low operates the Four Seasons Connection, which provides service from the Hondah Casino to Show Low and Pinetop-Lakeside.

Communities

 Canyon Day
 Carrizo
 Cedar Creek
 Cibecue
 East Fork
 Fort Apache
 Hondah
 McNary
 North Fork
 Rainbow City
 Seven Mile
 Turkey Creek
 Whiteriver

Education

Young Elementary School District included sections of the reservation. In 1984 the Young district contracted with Whiteriver Unified School District to educate the Fort Apache students, numbering about 200, due to roads being inaccessible between Fort Apache and Young.  these parts of the reservation are now directly in Whiteriver USD.

See also

 Apache
 Art of the American Southwest
 Battle of Cibecue Creek
 Battle of Fort Apache
 Rattlesnake Fire (2018)

References
 Fort Apache Reservation, Arizona United States Census Bureau
 
 Goodwin, Grenville (1994). Myths and Tales of the White Mountain Apache. University of Arizona Press

Footnotes

External links

 
 Fort Apache Heritage Foundation
 White Mountain Apache Tribe, Arizona Intertribal Council
 

American Indian reservations in Arizona
Geography of Apache County, Arizona
Geography of Gila County, Arizona
Geography of Navajo County, Arizona
Federally recognized tribes in the United States
Apache tribes
Mogollon Rim